Reli(so spelt as Relli, Relly, Raily, Raj, Pilenti) are an ethnic group, who reside in Indian states of Andhra Pradesh, Chhattisgarh and Odisha.

Demographics 

The Reli people are mainly distributed in coastal districts, such as Srikakulam, Vizianagaram, Visakhapatnam, East Godavari, West Godavari, Guntur, Nellore, Prakasam, Chittoor and Krishna of Andhra Pradesh, Jagdalpur of Chhattisgarh and the Koraput, Nabarangpur and Rayagada of Odisha.

According to the 2001 Census their population is 121,058 in Andhra Pradesh, 37 in Chhattisgarh and 8,357 in Odisha respectively.

Occupation 

The primary occupation of the Relli people in Andhra Pradesh is the collection and sale of fruits, seeds and grass. A few are in government service while the Reli of Odisha and Chhattisgarh trade in salt, rice, vegetables, goats, hens on a small scale. Agriculture is also pursued. They are listed as Scheduled Castes.

Language 
Reli people speak Reli language(Odia in Odisha) as their mother tongue and some words of it are close to Odia. The Reli people speak Telugu language in Andhra Pradesh, when conversing with outsiders. The Reli people speak Hindi language in Chhattisgarh. 

The 2001 Census stated that there were 21,238 speakers of the Reli language in Andhra Pradesh, 37 in Chhattisgarh and 4014 in Odisha. Further breakdown to the district level is as follows (2001 Census): Vizianagaram (AP) 7,893; Visakhapatnam (AP) 4,301; East  Godavari (AP) 3,079; Krishna (AP) 3,085; Srikakulam (AP) 1,796; Guntur (AP) 597, Koraput (OD) 1607; Rayagada (OD) 907 and Nabarangpur (OD) 1500, in Odisha,             

Jagdalpur (CG) 37 , in Chhattisgarh.

References

Further reading 
 2001 Census of India. Scheduled Caste http://censusindia.gov.in/Tables_Published/SCST/SCCRC_28.pdf (01- Feb-09)
 Lewis, M. Paul (ed.), 2009. Ethnologue: Languages of the World, Sixteenth edition. Dallas, Tex.: SIL International. Online version: 
 People of India http://fttkorea.net/docu/ftt57aap.pdf (01-Feb-09)
 Singh, K.S. 2003. People of India: Andhra Pradesh Vol13 Part 3. Delhi: Anthropological Survey of India and Affiliated east-west press pvt. ltd.
 Singh, K.S. 1993. People of India National Series. Volume 2. The Scheduled Caste. Delhi: Anthropological Survey of India and Oxford University Survey of India.
 Chenna Sanyasi Rao, Relli Charita, "రెల్లి చెరిత" (History of Rellis), Published by Dharma Trust, Visakhapatnam, 1999. Distributors: Visalandhra Publishing House, Hyderabad.
 Chenna Sanyasi Rao, Vuravatala Suriedu, "ఊరవతల సూరీడు" ( "Sun on the other side of the village), Anthology of Poems. Published by, Progressive Writers Association, Visakhapatnam, 2000. Distributors: Visalandhra Publishing House, Hyderabad.
 Mangalagiri Prasada Rao, "Dalitullo Dalitulu", "దళితుల్లో దళితులు" (the wretched among the wretched), Published by Sri Mangalagiri Siriyallu Mater Seva Trust, Visakhapatnam, 2012.

Ethnic groups in Odisha
Ethnic groups in Andhra Pradesh